Space and Time is an American magazine featuring speculative fiction. Publication of Space and Time started by Gordon Linzner on June 3, 1966. It publishes strange and unusual fiction, poetry, and art. A new issue has been released four times a year since 2008.

Gordon Linzner edited and published the magazine from its start in 1966 to 2007 when Hildy Silverman succeeded him in the post. Silverman published the magazine for the next 12 years before announcing its closure in late 2018. Angela Yuriko Smith took over on January 1, 2019, as the new owner and publisher beginning with issue #133.

References

External links 
 

Quarterly magazines published in the United States
Science fiction magazines published in the United States
Magazines established in 1966
Magazines published in Missouri